Southern Manx was a dialect of the Manx language.
It was used by speakers from the sheading of Rushen. It is possible that written Manx represents a 'midlands' dialect of Douglas and surrounding areas. In Southern Manx, older á and in some cases ó became [æː]. In Northern Manx the same happened, but á sometimes remained [aː] as well.

In Northern Manx, older (e)a before nn in the same syllable is diphthongised, while in Southern Manx it is lengthened but remains a monophthong. For example,  (cf. ) is [kʲaun] in the north but [kʲoːn] in the south.

References

Sources
 

Manx language